Elastica is the debut studio album by English alternative rock band Elastica. It was released on 14 March, 1995 through Deceptive Records in the UK and DCG/Geffen Records internationally. The album was nominated for the Mercury Music Prize. This is the only album to feature the original line-up, and guitarist Donna Matthews.

Reception

The album was well-received critically. In their retrospective review, AllMusic praised the album, writing "what makes Elastica such an intoxicating record is not only the way the 16 songs speed by in 40 minutes, but that they're nearly all classics" and that "hardly any new wave band made records this consistently rocking and melodic". BBC Music wrote "As albums that fall off a genre's radar go, Elastica's eponymous debut ranks high", calling it "a neglected gem" and the "blueprint for what Britpop should sound like".

Commercial performance
Elastica hit number one on the UK Albums Chart, becoming, at the time, the fastest-selling debut since Oasis' Definitely Maybe the previous year. The record also did well in the US, climbing to a peak of number 66 on the Billboard 200 after 11 weeks on the chart. Two months after its release, it had sold over 59,000 units in the US according to Nielsen Soundscan. By the end of 1995 it had sold approximately 1 million copies worldwide according to Billboard. Around half of these sales were in America where it was certified as gold December 1995. By April 2000, sales in the UK were estimated by the band's Deceptive label at 270,000 copies.

Legacy
Select ranked the album at number 9 in its list of the "50 albums of the year". The album fared better in end-of-year lists in the US where it was ranked as the fourth best album of the year by the Los Angeles Times, Rolling Stone, Spin and The Village Voice. In 2013, NME called it the 191st greatest album of all time. The album is also included in the book 1001 Albums You Must Hear Before You Die. In 2014, American LGBT magazine Metro Weekly ranked the album at number 38 in its list of the "50 Best Alternative Albums of the 90s". In 2017, Pitchfork listed the album at number six in its list "The 50 Best Britpop Albums".

Track listing

Personnel
Elastica
 Justine Frischmann – vocals, guitar
 Donna Matthews –  vocals, guitar
 Annie Holland – bass guitar
 Justin Welch – drums

Additional personnel
 Dan Abnormal (Damon Albarn) – Additional keyboards on tracks 4, 8 & 11

Production
 Marc Waterman – production, engineering, mixing
 Phil Vinall – mixing
 Alan Moulder – mixing
 Paul Tipler – mixing
 Bruce Lampcov – mixing
 John Leckie – mixing
 Mitti – mixing
 Juergen Teller – album photography
 Steve Lamacq – A&R
 Mark Kates – A&R

Charts

Weekly charts

Year-end charts

References

External links

Elastica at YouTube (streamed copy where licensed)
 
 Elastica (US version) at AllMusic

1995 debut albums
Elastica albums
DGC Records albums